In astrophysics, the Eddington number, is the number of protons in the observable universe.

History

Eddington argued that the value of the fine-structure constant, α, could be obtained by pure deduction. He related α to the Eddington number, which was his estimate of the number of protons in the universe. This led him in 1929 to conjecture that α was exactly 1/136. He devised a "proof" that NEdd = 136 × 2256, or about 1.57×1079. Other physicists did not adopt this conjecture and did not accept his argument.

In the late 1930s, the best experimental value of the fine-structure constant, α, was approximately 1/137. Eddington then argued, from aesthetic and numerological considerations, that α should be exactly 1/137. 

These estimates assume that all matter can be taken to be hydrogen and require assumed values for the number and size of galaxies and stars in the universe.

Attempts to find a mathematical basis for this dimensionless constant have continued up to the present time.

During a course of lectures that he delivered in 1938 as Tarner Lecturer at Trinity College, Cambridge, Eddington averred that:

This large number was soon named the "Eddington number".

Shortly thereafter, improved measurements of α yielded values closer to 1/137, whereupon Eddington changed his "proof" to show that α had to be exactly 1/137.

Recent theory
The most precise value of α (obtained experimentally in 2012) is:

Consequently, no reliable source any longer maintains that α is the reciprocal of an integer. Nor does anyone take seriously a mathematical relationship between α and NEdd.

On possible roles for NEdd in contemporary cosmology, especially its connection with large number coincidences, see Barrow (2002) (easier) and Barrow and Tipler (1986: 224–31) (harder).

See also
Eddington–Dirac number
Eddington number (cycling)
The Sand Reckoner
Universe

References

Bibliography

Large integers
Proton
Astrophysics
Physical cosmology